Vittorio Ferracini (born 8 November, 1951) is a retired Italian basketball player. He was part of Italian teams that won bronze medals at the 1975 European championships and finished fourth in 1977.

References

1951 births
Living people
Italian men's basketball players
1978 FIBA World Championship players